Cycloptilum is a genus of common scaly crickets in the family Mogoplistidae from the Americas. There are at least 50 described species in Cycloptilum.

Species
These 53 species belong to the genus Cycloptilum:

 Cycloptilum absconditum Otte, D. & Perez-Gelabert, 2009 c g
 Cycloptilum abstrusum Otte, D. & Perez-Gelabert, 2009 c g
 Cycloptilum adecton Otte, D. & Perez-Gelabert, 2009 c g
 Cycloptilum ainiktos Love and Walker, 1979 i c g
 Cycloptilum albocircum Love and Walker, 1979 i c g
 Cycloptilum ambrosion Otte, D. & Perez-Gelabert, 2009 c g
 Cycloptilum animosum Otte, D. & Perez-Gelabert, 2009 c g
 Cycloptilum antillarum (Redtenbacher, 1892) c g
 Cycloptilum antimimon Otte, D. & Perez-Gelabert, 2009 c g
 Cycloptilum aphanton Otte, D. & Perez-Gelabert, 2009 c g
 Cycloptilum bidens Hebard, 1931 i c g b (two-toothed scaly cricket)
 Cycloptilum celatum Otte, D. & Perez-Gelabert, 2009 c g
 Cycloptilum cineticon Otte, D. & Perez-Gelabert, 2009 c g
 Cycloptilum clandestinum Otte, D. & Perez-Gelabert, 2009 c g
 Cycloptilum comprehendens Hebard, 1929 i c g b (syncopated scaly cricket)
 Cycloptilum comptus Otte, D. & Perez-Gelabert, 2009 c g
 Cycloptilum contectum (Rehn, J.A.G. & Hebard, 1912) c g
 Cycloptilum crypton Otte, D. & Perez-Gelabert, 2009 c g
 Cycloptilum distinctum Hebard, 1931 c g
 Cycloptilum distinctus Hebard, 1931 i
 Cycloptilum eidalimos Otte, D. & Perez-Gelabert, 2009 c g
 Cycloptilum epimonon Otte, D. & Perez-Gelabert, 2009 c g
 Cycloptilum erraticum Scudder, S.H., 1893 c g
 Cycloptilum eucharistos Otte, D. & Perez-Gelabert, 2009 c g
 Cycloptilum eumorphos Otte, D. & Perez-Gelabert, 2009 c g
 Cycloptilum eustatiensis Bland & Desutter-Grandcolas, 2003 c g
 Cycloptilum exsanguis Love and Walker, 1979 i c g
 Cycloptilum halticon Otte, D. & Perez-Gelabert, 2009 c g
 Cycloptilum hypoclopon Otte, D. & Perez-Gelabert, 2009 c g
 Cycloptilum inops Otte, D. & Perez-Gelabert, 2009 c g
 Cycloptilum irregularis Love and Walker, 1979 i c g
 Cycloptilum kelainopum Love and Walker, 1979 i c g
 Cycloptilum liberum Otte, D. & Perez-Gelabert, 2009 c g
 Cycloptilum minimum Caudell, 1922 c g
 Cycloptilum nesydrion Otte, D. & Perez-Gelabert, 2009 c g
 Cycloptilum occultum Otte, D. & Perez-Gelabert, 2009 c g
 Cycloptilum opertanium Otte, D. & Perez-Gelabert, 2009 c g
 Cycloptilum oriplanes Otte, D. & Perez-Gelabert, 2009 c g
 Cycloptilum panurgon Otte, D. & Perez-Gelabert, 2009 c g
 Cycloptilum pigrum Love and Walker, 1979 i c g
 Cycloptilum pusillulum Otte, D. & Perez-Gelabert, 2009 c g
 Cycloptilum quatrainum Love and Walker, 1979 i c g
 Cycloptilum sanum Otte, D. & Perez-Gelabert, 2009 c g
 Cycloptilum slossoni (Scudder, 1897) i c g b (Slosson's scaly cricket)
 Cycloptilum spectabile Strohecker, 1939 i c g
 Cycloptilum squamosum Scudder, 1869 i c g b (Scudder's scaly cricket)
 Cycloptilum tardum Love and Walker, 1979 i c g
 Cycloptilum thoracicum Hebard, 1928 c g
 Cycloptilum thymicon Otte, D. & Perez-Gelabert, 2009 c g
 Cycloptilum tornatilis Otte, D. & Perez-Gelabert, 2009 c g
 Cycloptilum trigonipalpum (Rehn & Hebard, 1912) i c g b (forest scaly cricket)
 Cycloptilum velox Love and Walker, 1979 i c g
 Cycloptilum zebra (Rehn and Hebard, 1905) i c g

Data sources: i = ITIS, c = Catalogue of Life, g = GBIF, b = Bugguide.net

References

Further reading

 
 

Crickets
Ensifera genera
Taxonomy articles created by Polbot